Friends of UNFPA is a non-profit organization, headquartered in New York, that supports the work of UNFPA, the United Nations sexual and reproductive health and rights agency. UNFPA promotes a world where every pregnancy is wanted, every childbirth is safe, and every young person’s potential is fulfilled. Friends of UNFPA advances UNFPA’s global effort by mobilizing funds and action for UNFPA’s work. 
Friends of UNFPA was previously known as Americans for UNFPA. It completed a name change in 2012.

Leadership

Officers of Board of Directors 
Jacob Onufrychuk (Chair of the Board), Senior Manager, Breakthru Beverage Group. 
Mari Simonen (Vice Chair of the Board, Nominating Committee Chair), Former Special Adviser to the Executive Director of UNFPA. 
Connie Smith (Development & Communications Committee Chair Secretary) Speech pathologist and Co-founder of the Global Neighborhood Fund.
Monica Parekh (Treasurer) Senior Corporate Analyst at American Century Investments.

UNFPA’s work

UNFPA works in 155 countries to ensure that women and girls everywhere have access to the lifesaving reproductive healthcare that is their right. In particular, UNFPA works to end preventable maternal death, end the unmet need for family planning, and end gender-based violence, including harmful practices like child marriage and female genital mutilation.  UNFPA improves maternal health by increasing access to voluntary family planning, training skilled birth attendants, and increasing access to emergency obstetric care.
UNFPA assists countries in forecasting and supplying their needs for contraceptives, condoms, and other reproductive health supplies. Each year, the organization provides 500 million couples with contraception.

Fundraising

Friends of UNFPA mobilizes funds towards UNFPA’s worldwide programs and services as well as their campaigns such as Maternal Health Thematic Fund, Campaigns for Fistula and Humanitarian Relief.

References

External links
friendsofunfpa.org

United Nations Population Fund